Hawise, Countess of Aumale (died 11 March 1214) was ruling Countess of Aumale from 1179 until 1194 with her husbands. She was the daughter and heiress of William, Count of Aumale and Cicely, daughter and co-heiress of William fitz Duncan. She became Countess of Essex by her marriage to William de Mandeville, 3rd Earl of Essex.

Life
Hawise was countess in her own right when she married, on 14 January 1180, to William, Earl of Essex. On his death late in 1189 the widowed Hawise was described by chronicler Richard of Devizes as "a woman who was almost a man, lacking nothing virile except the virile organs." In addition to her inherited lands in Normandy and England (which included the Honour of Holderness, in the eastern part of Yorkshire), she received in dower one-third of the substantial Mandeville estates. After a widowhood of less than a year, she remarried. Her second husband was William de Forz (or in Latin de Fortibus) of Oleron.  The Poitevin was one of the commanders of the crusading fleet of King Richard I, and the match is said to have been forced on Countess Hawise by that king. 

The countess gave birth to a son and eventual heir, also named William. Her second husband died in 1195. King Richard gave her in marriage to Baldwin de Béthune, his companion on crusade and in captivity. Baldwin had previously served King Henry II as ambassador to the count of Flanders in 1178. The following year, in 1179, he and Earl William de Mandeville escorted King Philip Augustus to visit the tomb of newly canonized Archbishop Thomas Becket in Canterbury.  

King Henry had promised Baldwin marriage to a certain rich heiress, but King Richard had chosen to give that heiress in marriage to another.  Now Richard fulfilled his father's promise with an even wealthier heiress, but their enjoyment of her Aumale lands in Normandy was short-lived. King Philip Augustus took Aumale in August 1196 and it remained in the hands of the French king thereafter. Baldwin died in October 1212. When King John proposed a fourth husband, Hawise declined. She paid 5,000 marks for her inheritance, her dower lands, and "that she be not distrained to marry". By September 1213 she had paid £1,000 of that fine.

References

1214 deaths
English countesses
12th-century English women
Year of birth unknown
Place of birth unknown
Place of death unknown
12th-century women rulers
12th-century English nobility
13th-century English landowners
12th-century English landowners